Ouyi Zhixu (蕅益智旭, pinyin: Ǒuyì Zhìxù; 1599-1655) was a Chinese Buddhist scholar monk in 17th century China. He is considered a patriarch of the Chinese Pure Land School, a Chan master, as well as a great exponent of Tiantai Buddhism. He was also one of the Four Eminent Monks of the Wanli Era, after Yunqi Zhuhong (1535–1615), Hanshan Deqing (1546–1623), and Daguan Zhenke (1543–1604). He is most well known for his non-sectarian and syncretic writings, which draw on various traditions like Tiantai, Pure Land, and Chan, and also engage with Confucian, Daoist and Jesuit sources.

Overview

Life 
Ouyi was a native of Suzhou, Jiangsu province (South Zhili). He was initially a student of Confucianism and rejected Buddhism, writing various anti-Buddhist tracts. However, after reading the works of Yunqi Zhuhong, he changed his mind and burned his old writings. When he was 19, his father died and Zhixu devoted himself completely to Buddhism, studying the sutras and practicing meditation.

At the age of 24, he became a monk at Yunqi temple under Master Khan Xueling, a disciple of Hanshan Deqing. During this 20s he studied Yogachara, practiced Chan based on the Shurangama Sutra, and he also experienced a great awakening during Chan meditation. After his mother died when he was 28, he experienced a spiritual crisis and turned to the Pure Land practice of nianfo (reciting the Buddha's name). When he was 31, he drew lots to determine whether he should write a commentary on the Sutra of Brahma's Net based on Tiantai, Yogacara, Huayan or “a school of his own” (zili). He drew the lot for Tiantai. According to Foulks, his use of lots (rather than lineage ties or doctrinal reasons) for writing from a specific Buddhist tradition suggests that he saw these schools of thought as "not only compatible but also interchangeable." 

In his 30s he studied the Tiantai school extensively and began wrote many commentaries and essays on Buddhist sutras. He also became interested in mantra practice in his 30s, particularly the mantra of Kṣitigarbha. Ouyi Zhixu became a public teacher during this time, writing and lecturing extensively. 

Ouyi promoted a non-sectarian worldview that exemplified the “harmonization of traditions” (zhuzong ronghe) and the “unity of the Three Teachings” (三教合一 sanjiao heyi), i.e. Buddhism, Confucianism and Daoism.   

At the age of 56, he underwent another serious illness, after which he devoted himself almost entirely to Pure Land practice. Ouyi died in 1656, at fifty-seven. Ouyi Zhixu's work was influential on many later Chinese Buddhists including modern reformists like Taixu (1889–1947), Yinshun, and Hongyi (1880–1942). The modern Chinese Buddhist teacher Sheng Yen (1930–2009) wrote his doctoral dissertation on Ouyi, and considered Ouyi to be one of the greatest modern Buddhist figures (alongside Taixu, Ouyang Jingwu, and Yinshun).

View of the Pure Land method 
As with other Ming authors on Pure Land at the time, Ouyi Zhixu defended the view that Pure Land practice worked through a symbiotic combination of the "other power" of the Buddha Amitabha with the "self power" of a person's Buddhist practice. This symbiosis was called “sympathetic resonance” (ganying 感應). 

For Ouyi Zhixu, reciting the Buddha's name must be coupled with faith and vows for the optimum practice. However, he also held that even if our mind is scattered, reciting the name still plants wholesome seeds in the mind (though this does not guarantee rebirth in the Pure Land). His moderate position is also evident in his understanding of how meditation (chan), doctrine (jiao) and precepts (lü) are all important and complementary elements of Buddhist practice.

In his Commentary on the Amitābha-sūtra, Ouyi explains the Pure Land teaching by relying on the Yogacara mind-only (cittamatra) philosophy. J.C. Cleary explains Ouyi's understanding as follows:There is only one reality: Dharmakaya Buddha, the Buddha-Mind, the One Mind. All things are just waves, ripples, evanescent bubbles, appearing in the ocean of this One Mind: all worlds, all Buddhas, all sentient beings, all times, all places, all worlds, all the lived experiences of all beings in all worlds in all times. Note how the One Mind worldview emphasizes our link to the absolute, without effacing our individuality. The Buddha-Mind is all that exists, but we too have Buddha-nature, and our own personal little minds are permeated by the Buddha-Mind, even if we do not recognize it. All that ignorance, delusion, and bad karma can do is screen us off from an awareness of our true nature, our Buddha-nature, our essential integration in the One Mind. But when we use our petty little minds to assess or to access the One Mind, it is literally like ladling out the ocean in a teacup. This is where the compassionate expedient means of the Buddhas and Bodhisattvas come to our rescue. All true Buddhist teachings are situation-specific channels designed to bring us to the realization of the One Mind. The true Buddhist teachings vary in form and application, but are one in intent. In his commentary Master Ou-i constantly refers to the fact that the apparently wondrous and even unbelievable powers of reciting Amitabha’s name are inherent in our connection to the One Mind. “We must realize that there is no name of Amitabha apart from the mind of infinite light and infinite life that is before us now at this moment, and there is no way for us to penetrate the mind of infinite light and infinite life that is before us now at this moment apart from the name of Amitabha. I hope you will ponder this deeply!”  Furthermore, master Ouyi writes:Reciting the Buddha-name at the level of inner truth means believing that Amitabha’s Pure Land in the West is an inherent feature of our own minds, the creation of our own minds. It means using the great name of Amitabha, which is inherent in our minds and the creation of our minds, as a focal point to concentrate our minds on, so that we never forget it for a moment.

View of other traditions 
Ouyi Zhixu had a non-sectarian view of the various forms of Buddhism, seeing them all as useful skillful means (upaya). According to Zhixu:The potentials and circumstances of sentient beings all differ, and so all different forms of the Buddhist Teaching have been devised, some open, some closed, using all sorts of terminology. The Teaching is expressed effectively to all sentient beings according to what they are ready to hear.Ouyi was well versed in the different Buddhist traditions of China, and according to his autobiography, he saw himself as being part of an inclusive tradition that included diverse Buddhisms such as Tiantai, Chan, Vinaya, and Pure Land. 

Ouyi also had a deep knowledge of Confucianism and in some of his writings he sought to integrate Buddhism and Confucianism, which he saw as deeply compatible and complementary. Ouyi held that "the teachings of the Buddha and the sages are doing nothing else but urging us to exert our minds to the utmost." For Ouyi, the profound meaning and ultimate source of Buddhism and Confucianism were the same true original mind. 

He also saw Buddhism and Confucianism as approaching the same truth in different ways, writing:that the Great Way lies in the human mind is the only principle that has existence throughout the ages and is not privately owned by the Buddha and the sages. The unification of difference and convergence in sameness, is beyond the reach of Confucianism, Buddhism, and Daoism. In terms of reality, the Way is neither of this world, nor beyond this world. Thus, entering truth through the Way is called otherworldliness; entering the secular through the Way is called worldliness. Both the true and the secular are externalities, and externalities do not deviate from the way...Confucianism and Daoism both use true doctrines to protect the secular, so that the secular will not go against the truth; Buddhism approaches the secular to understand the truth, wherein the truth does not mix with the secular. Ouyi wrote a Chan interpretation of the Book of Changes (Yijing) and he said that this was "nothing else but an introduction of Chan into Confucianism, in order to entice Confucians to understand Chan". Ouyi went as far as to write that "Confucianism, Daoism, Chan, Vinaya, Doctrinal Buddhism were nothing but yellow leaves and empty fists", meaning that they were all just skillful means (upaya) that could be used to attain the One Principle (yili).

In his autobiography, Ouyi describes himself as "a follower of the eight negations". This term can have different connotations, including eight negations found in Madhyamaka sources ("neither arising nor ceasing, neither eternal nor impermanent, neither unitary nor different, neither coming nor going"). However, Ouyi also writes that this term can mean that he does not follow or study "Confucianism, Chan, Vinaya, and the Teachings." Foulks writes that this means Ouyi was "refusing to be categorized as Confucian or Buddhist (in any particular tradition), Ouyi instead espouses the most general religious identification of “follower” or “a person on the path” (daoren)". According to Foulks, in his autobiography, Ouyi defends a "broad, nonsectarian religiosity" instead of focusing on any specific Buddhist tradition or seeing himself as part of  any "school" (zong).

Critique of Christianity 
Ouyi wrote the Bixie ji (Collected Essays Refuting Heterodoxy) critiquing Christianity and defending Buddhism against the attacks of Christian Jesuit missionaries like Michele Ruggieri (1543-1607) and Matteo Ricci (1552-1610). He especially focused on critiquing Christian theodicy and Christian ethics. According to Beverley Foulks, Zhixu "objects to the way Jesuits invest God with qualities of love, hatred, and the power to punish. He criticizes the notion that God would create humans to be both good and evil, and finally he questions why God would allow Lucifer to tempt humans towards evil." Zhixu generally writes his critiques of Christianity from a Confucian perspective, drawing on Confucian works instead of citing Buddhist sources. 

According to Foulks, Zhixu was also concerned with the ethical implications of Christianity, since he saw benevolence (ren 仁) as deriving from humans and their self-cultivation, but "if humans receive their nature from an external source, they can absolve themselves of ethical responsibility; moreover, since Jesuits disavow reincarnation, they further curtail the ability of humans to morally better themselves and render them entirely dependent on God or Jesus to absolve them of their wrongdoings."

Works 
Master Ouyi's oeuvre amounts to around seventy-five works. This include treatises and commentaries on the teachings and texts of Mahayana Sutras, Chan, Tiantai, Yogacara, Vinaya, Bodhisattva Precepts, Pure Land as well as on Confucian classics. The Chinese Buddhist Book Bureau has collected all of his extant works into the Full Anthology of Master Ouyi (蕅益大师全集). 

Some of his important works include:

 Emituojing yaojie (Essential Explanations of the Amitābha-sūtra). This has been translated into English by Jonathan Christopher Cleary as Mind-seal of the Buddhas: patriarch Ou-i's commentary on the Amitabha Sutra. The commentary "often uses T’ien-t’ai categories, and is firmly based on the ontology of Yogacara philosophy."
 Explanation of the Keypoints to the Heart Sutra (Taisho # M555).
 Meaning of Lankāvatāra Sūtra in one volume (楞伽经玄义). 
 Commentary of Lankāvatāra Sūtra in ten volumes (楞伽经义疏). 
 Meaning of Surangama Sūtra in two volumes (楞严经玄義). 
 Sentence Elaboration of Surangama Sūtra in ten volumes (楞严经文句). 
 Interpretation of Contemplating on Mind in Diamond Sūtra in one volume (金刚经观心释). 
 Meaning Collection of the Lotus Sūtra in 16 volumes (法华会义). 
 Thread through Lotus Sūtra in one volume (法华经纶贯). 
 Annotation of the Brahma Net Sūtra (梵網經合註). 
 The Meaning of the Brahma Net Sūtra (梵網經玄义).
 Breaking Empty by Diamond Sastra in two volumes 金刚破空论
 An Annotated Yogacara Summary of the Bodhisattva Precept Sūtra (菩萨戒本经笺要).
 Jingtu shiyao (Ten essentials about the Pure Land)
 Pìxiè jí (闢邪集; Collected Essays Refuting Heterodoxy). 
 Essentials of Contemplation on Mind in the Vijñāptimātratāsiddhi with ten volumes (成唯识论观心法要). 
 Commentary the Awakening of Faith in six volumes (起信论裂網疏). 
 Lingfeng zonglun (靈峰宗論), in 38 volumes, which presents Ouyi's philosophical thought and views on religious practice. 
 Zhouyi chanjie (An Chan Explanation of the Book of Changes).
 Sishu Ouyi Jie (Ouyi's Interpretation of the Four Books).
 Commentary on the Divination Sutra (占察善惡業報經). 
 Xuanfo tu (選佛圖, Table for Buddha Selection), a board game based on the Shengguan tu 陞官圖 (Table of Bureaucratic Promotion).
 Yuezangzhijin (阅 藏 知 津), explanations of the titles of the sutras in the Chinese Tripitaka. 
 Fahaiguanlan (法海觀澜), contains outlines of major Mahayana and Hinayana sūtras and shastras. 
 [Auto]biography of the Follower of Eight Negations (Babu daoren zhuan) - Ouyi's autobiography.

References

Sources 
 Charles B. Jones (Trans.) Pì xiè jí 闢邪集: Collected Refutations of Heterodoxy by Ouyi Zhixu (蕅益智旭, 1599–1655). Journal of the Institute of Buddhist Studies Third Series Number 11 Fall 2009.
 Cleary, J.C.;Van Hien Study Group (1996). Mind-seal of the Buddhas: patriarch Ou-i's commentary on the Amitabha Sutra, The Amitabha Buddha Association of Queensland (Australia).
 Foulks McGuire, Beverley (2014). Living Karma: The Religious Practices of Ouyi Zhixu, Columbia University Press.
 Foulks McGuire, Beverley. Duplicitous Thieves: Ouyi Zhixu’s Criticism of Jesuit Missionaries in Late Imperial China. Chung-Hwa Buddhist Journal (2008, 21:55-75) Taipei: Chung-Hwa Institute of Buddhist Studies 中華佛學學報第二十一期 頁55-75 (民國九十七年)，臺北：中華佛學研究所 ISSN:1017-7132
 Lo, Y.K. (2008). Change beyond syncretism: Ouyi Zhixu's Buddhist hermeneutics of the Yijing. Journal of Chinese Philosophy 35 (2) : 273-295. ScholarBank@NUS Repository. https://doi.org/10.1111/j.1540-6253.2008.00478.x
 Zhongjian Mou (2023). A Brief History of the Relationship Between Confucianism, Daoism, and Buddhism. Springer Nature.

Ming dynasty Buddhist monks
Chinese spiritual writers
Ming dynasty writers
Buddhist apologists